Arjen Livyns (born 1 September 1994) is a Belgian cyclist, who currently rides for UCI ProTeam .

Major results
2016
 7th Grote Prijs Jef Scherens
2017
 2nd Grand Prix Criquielion
 3rd Antwerpse Havenpijl
 4th Flèche Ardennaise
2019
 7th Grand Prix de Wallonie
 9th Circuit de Wallonie
2020
 2nd Grand Prix de la Ville de Lillers
 6th Trofeo Matteotti
2021
 1st  Combativity classification, Benelux Tour
 5th Grand Prix La Marseillaise
2022
 6th Brussels Cycling Classic

References

External links

1994 births
Living people
Belgian male cyclists
People from Waregem
Cyclists from West Flanders
21st-century Belgian people